Greatest Hits, Volume 2 is the second of two greatest hits albums released on the same day in 1992 by country music artist Randy Travis. Three new songs were recorded for this album and one, "Look Heart, No Hands", was released as a single and reached No. 1 on the Billboard Hot Country Songs chart. The other newly recorded songs were "Take Another Swing at Me" and "I'd Do It All Again With You". This album has so far been Travis' last album to be certified platinum by the RIAA.

Track listing

Chart performance

Notes 

Albums produced by Kyle Lehning
1992 greatest hits albums
Warner Records compilation albums
Randy Travis compilation albums